İnal Batu (24 September 1936 – 5 August 2013) was a Turkish diplomat, politician and member of the Grand National Assembly of Turkey.

Biography
He was born on 24 September 1936 in Ankara as the son of Selahattin Batu (1905–1973), a zoologist and politician. He studied Diplomacy and Foreign Relations at the Faculty of Political Science, Ankara University, graduating in 1960.

İnal Batu served at various Turkish diplomatic missions including Lefkoşa, Prague, Mexico City, Islamabad and as Ambassador to Italy in Rome. He was also the Permanent Representative of Turkey to the United Nations from 1993 to 1995. It was emphasized that Batu played an important role in the resolution of the Imia/Kardak crisis, which broke out in late 1995 between Greece and Turkey, with his constructive ideas and proposals.

Following the 2002 general election, he entered the parliament as a deputy of Hatay Province from the Republican People's Party, serving until 2007.

He was member of the board of Fenerbahçe SK and served also as its vice president.

Batu died from heart failure at the age of 76 on 5 August 2013 at a hospital in Istanbul, where he had been treated for two months. Following the religious funeral service at the Teşvikiye Mosque, he was laid to rest at the Zincirlikuyu Cemetery. He was survived by his wife Nevra, daughter Pelin Batu, a film and television actress and son Arda Batu, an academic.

References

20th-century diplomats
1936 births
2013 deaths
Ambassadors of Turkey to Italy
Ankara University Faculty of Political Sciences alumni
Burials at Zincirlikuyu Cemetery
Deputies of Hatay
Fenerbahçe S.K. board members
Members of the 22nd Parliament of Turkey
Permanent Representatives of Turkey to the United Nations
Republican People's Party (Turkey) politicians
Turkish people of Circassian descent